Cavallino Magazine (1978–) is a bi-monthly magazine that publishes articles on Ferrari automobiles, racing and personalities. It is based in Boca Raton, Florida.

The first issue was the September and October issue in 1978 when Chuck Queener was editor, featuring articles by Stanley Nowak on the first 100 Ferrari's that were built, and by Edwin K. Niles on the Ferrari 225 Sport.

It is the sponsor of the Palm Beach Cavallino Classic, an annual gathering of Ferrari enthusiasts in Palm Beach, Florida at The Breakers Resort. It is also the sponsor of the Classic Sports Sunday in Palm Beach, Florida.

The Cavallino Inc. media and event company was acquired in 2020 by Canossa Events of Italy, at a time when John Barnes and Alicia Barnes were  president and vice president. Canossa had in 2019 became a part of Motorsport Network of Miami.

Canossa also holds the Cavallino Classic Modena show, beginning in 2021.

References

External links
 Official website
 Coverage of first 246 issues

1978 establishments in Florida
Automobile magazines published in the United States
Bimonthly magazines published in the United States
Ferrari
Magazines established in 1978
Magazines published in Florida